The Minister of Finance (de facto Deputy Prime Minister) was a member of the Executive Committee of the Privy Council of Northern Ireland (Cabinet) in the Parliament of Northern Ireland which governed Northern Ireland from 1921 to 1972.  The post was combined with that of the Prime Minister of Northern Ireland for a brief period in 1940 – 41 and was vacant for two weeks during 1953, following the death of incumbent Minister John Maynard Sinclair.  The Office was often seen as being occupied by the Prime Minister's choice of successor.  Two Ministers of Finance went on to be Prime Minister, while two more, Maginness and Jack Andrews were widely seen as possible successors to the Premiership.

Deputy Prime Minister
From 3 May 1969, a separate and distinct office of Deputy Prime Minister was created and occupied by Jack Andrews, who was also Leader of the Senate.

Parliamentary and Financial Secretary to the Ministry of Finance
1921 – 1937 Milne Barbour
1937 – 1940 Alexander Gordon
1940 – 1941 vacant
1941 – 1943 Maynard Sinclair
Office abolished 1943

Parliamentary Secretary to the Ministry of Finance (and Chief Whip)
1921 – 1942 Herbert Dixon, 1st Baron Glentoran
1942 – 1944 Sir Norman Stronge
1944 – 1945 Sir Wilson Hungerford
1945 – 1947 Lancelot Curran
1947 – 1956 Walter Topping
1956 – 1959 Brian Faulkner
1959 – 1963 Isaac George Hawthorne
1963: William Craig
1963 – 1966 James Chichester-Clark
1966 – 1968 vacant
1968 – 1969 Roy Bradford
Office abolished 1969

Assistant Parliamentary Secretary to the Ministry of Finance (and Assistant Chief Whip)
1921 – 1925 Thomas Henry Burn
1925 – 1929 Henry Mulholland
1929 – 1933 Sir Basil Brooke
1933 – 1941 Sir Wilson Hungerford
1941 – 1942 Sir Norman Stronge
1942 – 1943 Robert Corkey
1943 – 1945 vacant
1945 – 1958 John Edgar Bailey
1958 Harry West
1958 – 1961 William James Morgan
1961 – 1963 William Fitzsimmons
1963 James Chichester-Clark
1963 – 1965 vacant
1965 – 1966 Isaac George Hawthorne
1966 – 1967 Roy Bradford and Samuel Magowan
1967 – 1968 Samuel Magowan and vacancy
1968 – 1969 Samuel Magowan and Joseph Burns
1969 Samuel Magowan and John William Kennedy
Office abolished 1969

References
The Government of Northern Ireland

1921 establishments in Northern Ireland
1972 disestablishments in Northern Ireland
Executive Committee of the Privy Council of Northern Ireland
Ministers of Finance of Northern Ireland